Rufus Hatten (June 16, 1912 – December 1968) was an American Negro league catcher in the 1940s.

A native of Panama City, Florida, Hatten made his Negro leagues debut in 1942 with the Memphis Red Sox, and went on to play for the Chicago American Giants and Baltimore Elite Giants through 1946. In 1952, he played minor league baseball for the Bluefield Blue-Grays. Hatten died in Ocala, Florida in 1968 at age 56.

References

External links
 and Seamheads

1912 births
1968 deaths
Date of death missing
Baltimore Elite Giants players
Chicago American Giants players
Memphis Red Sox players
20th-century African-American sportspeople